Kilree is a former Christian monastery and National Monument located in County Kilkenny, Ireland.

Location

Kilree is located 2.4 km (1 mile) south of Kells, County Kilkenny.

History

The monastery at Kilree was supposedly founded in the 6th century by Saint Rhuidche, from which the name Cell-righ derives.

Niall Caille, High King of Ireland, is locally believed to have drowned in the Kings River at Callan in AD 846 and his body washed up near Kells, County Kilkenny.  However the Annals of the Four Masters and Annals of Inishfallen are clear the king drowned in the river Callan near Armagh. Some local histories claim he was buried under the high cross at Kilree, others that he was buried outside the church grounds there because he was a pagan. The Annals however record he was heavily involved in a power struggle between two dominant monastic traditions - that of Patrick versus Brigit, with Niall favouring the latter, so the tale of his paganism is not credible. He was primarily the king of Ailech, which was in western County Londonderry, again making it unlikely he is connected with Kilree.

The site came into the possession of Kells Priory by 1340. It was surrendered to Henry VIII in 1539, and he granted the abbot a life pension.

Buildings

Church

This is an early church with pronounced antae, indicating that it is pre-Romanesque in date. It still retains its oval enclosure.

Round tower

The bell-storey has four lintelled windows facing the cardinal directions. The cap is gone but battlements remain.

The tower stands on a rectangular stone pad-foundation, only found here and at Aghaviller.

High cross

Kilree High Cross was erected in the 8th/9th Century. The east face has a hunting scene. The west face depicts the Adoration of the Magi and Daniel in the Lions' Den.

References

Christian monasteries in the Republic of Ireland
Religion in County Kilkenny
Archaeological sites in County Kilkenny
National Monuments in County Kilkenny